This is a list of British television related events from 1958.

Events

January
14 January – TWW, the first ITV franchise for South Wales and the West of England, goes on the air.

February
13 February – A by-election is covered on UK television for the first time when Granada broadcasts coverage of the 1958 Rochdale by-election; broadcast presenter Ludovic Kennedy takes second place for the Liberals, considerably increasing their share of the vote.
17 February – Pope Pius XII designates St. Clare of Assisi as the patron saint of television. Thereafter, placing her icon on a television set is said to improve reception.
18 February – Footage of the annual Shrove Tuesday Atherstone Ball Game is shown on television for the first time.

March
31 March – Debut of the BBC's serial Starr and Company, set in an engineering firm. The programme is aired for nine months.

April
14 April — The newly magnetic videotape machine Vision Electronic Recording Apparatus or VERA for short, is given a live demonstration on air in Panorama where Richard Dimbleby seated by a clock, talks for a couple of minutes about the new method of vision recording with an instant playback. The tape is then wound back and replayed. The picture is slightly watery, but reasonably watchable, and instant playback is something completely new.

May
5 May – First experimental transmissions of a 625-line television service.

June
No events.

July
No events.

August
30 August – Southern Television, the ITV franchise for the South of England, goes on the air.

September
No events.

October
11 October – The long running Saturday afternoon sports programme Grandstand debuts on the BBC Television Service. It airs until 2007.
16 October – Blue Peter, the world's longest-running children's TV programme, debuts on the BBC Television Service. It continues to air into the 2020s.
28 October – The State Opening of Parliament is broadcast on television for the first time.

November
30 November – During the live broadcast of the Armchair Theatre play Underground on the ITV network, actor Gareth Jones has a fatal heart attack between two of his scenes while in make-up.

December
No events.

Debuts

BBC Television Service/BBC TV
 1 January – Big Guns  (1958)
 4 January – Saturday Playhouse (1958–1961)
 24 January – Pride and Prejudice (1958)
 February – Your Life in Their Hands (1958–1964; 1979–1987; 1991)
 2 February – Monitor (1958–1965) 
 7 February – Run To Earth (1958)
 9 February – The Government Inspector (1958)
 12 February – More Than Robbery (1958)
 March – Starr and Company (1958)
 7 March – The Diary of Samuel Pepys  (1958)
 22 March – Captain Moonlight - Man of Mystery (1958)
 26 March – Sammy (1958)
 11 April – The Common Room (1958–1959)
 22 April – Railway Roundabout (1958–1962)
 7 May –  White Heather Club (1958–1968)
 13 May –  The Dangerous Game (1958)
 17 May –  Duty Bound (1958)
 1 June –  The Adventures of Ben Gunn (1958)
 14 June – The Black and White Minstrel Show (1958–1978)
 24 June – The Firm of Girdlestone (1958)
 5 July – Fair Game (1958)
 20 July – Queen's Champion (1958)
 16 August – Charlesworth at Large (1958)
 6 September – Jennings at School (1958)
 12 September –  Champion Road (1958)
 14 September – Little Women (1958)
 29 September – Leave It to Todhunter  (1958)
 11 October – Grandstand (1958–2007)
 14 October – Yesterday's Enemy (1958)
 16 October – Blue Peter (1958–present)
 4 November –  The Mad O'Haras (1958)
 7 November – Our Mutual Friend (1958–1959)
 10 November – Solo for Canary (1958)
 11 November –  Charlie Drake (1958–1960)
 4 December –  Private Investigator (1958–1959)
 22 December – Quatermass and the Pit (1958–1959)

ITV
 5 January – Ivanhoe (1958–1959)
 14 January – Gwlad y Gan (1958–1964)
 4 February –  East End, West End (1958)
 21 February – Sword of Freedom (1958–1961)
 18 March – Hotel Imperial (1958–1960)
 23 March – The Killing Stones  (1958)
 30 March –  Time Out for Peggy (1958)
 5 April – African Patrol (1958–1959)
 15 April – Lucky Dip (1958–1959)
 26 April – The Truth About Melandrinos (1958)
 30 June – My Wife and I (1958)
 6 July – Dial 999 (1958–1959)
 13 September 
 Dotto (1958–1960)
 Oh Boy! (1958–1959)
 Mary Britten, M.D. (1958)
 14 September – The Invisible Man (1958–1959)
 15 September – Make Me Laugh (1958)
 19 September – The Larkins (1958–1960; 1963–1964)
 20 September – The Adventures of William Tell (1958–1959)
 26 September – Educating Archie  (1958–1959)
 6 October – Cannonball (1958–1959)
 12 October – After Hours (1958–1959)
 6 December – All Aboard (1958–1959)
Unknown 
Wagon Train (1958–1961, 1962–1966)
Cheyenne (1958–1963)
Dick and the Duchess (1958–1959)
Martin Kane, Private Eye (1958–1959)
Sea Hunt (1958–1961)
The Verdict Is Yours (1958–1959; 1962–1963)

Continuing television shows

1920s
BBC Wimbledon (1927–1939, 1946–2019, 2021–2024)

1930s
The Boat Race (1938–1939, 1946–2019)
BBC Cricket (1939, 1946–1999, 2020–2024)

1940s
Come Dancing (1949–1998)

1950s
Andy Pandy (1950–1970, 2002–2005)
All Your Own (1952–1961)
Watch with Mother (1952–1975) 
Rag, Tag and Bobtail (1953–1965)
The Good Old Days (1953–1983)
Panorama (1953–present)
The Adventures of Robin Hood (1955–1960)
Picture Book (1955–1965)
Sunday Night at the London Palladium (1955–1967, 1973–1974)
Take Your Pick! (1955–1968, 1992–1998)
Double Your Money (1955–1968)
Dixon of Dock Green (1955–1976)
Crackerjack (1955–1984, 2020–present)
Hancock's Half Hour (1956–1961)
Opportunity Knocks (1956–1978, 1987–1990)
This Week (1956–1978, 1986–1992)
Armchair Theatre (1956–1974)
What the Papers Say (1956–2008)
The Army Game (1957–1961)
The Sky at Night (1957–present)
The Woody Woodpecker Show (1957–1997)

Ending this year
 The Flower Pot Men (1952–1958, 2001–2002)
 The Woodentops (1955–1958)
 Educated Evans (1957–1958)
 Living It Up (1957–1958)
 Six-Five Special (1957–1958)

Births

 10 January – Caroline Langrishe, actress
 24 January – Jools Holland, British musician
 29 January – Linda Smith, comedian (died 2006)
 11 February – Michael Jackson, British broadcast executive
 20 February – James Wilby, British actor
 3 March – Miranda Richardson, English actress
 7 March – Rik Mayall, comedian and actor (died 2014)
 13 March – Linda Robson, actress 
 14 March – Francine Stock, radio and television presenter and author
 21 March – Gary Oldman, English actor
 14 April – Peter Capaldi, Scottish actor and director
 3 May – Sandi Toksvig,  Danish-born comedian, author, and radio presenter
 17 May – Paul Whitehouse, Welsh comedian and actor
 18 May – Toyah Willcox, actress and singer
 22 May – Denise Welch, actress and television presenter
 6 July – Jennifer Saunders, comedienne and actress 
 24 July – Joe McGann, actor
 31 July – Sue Jenkins, actress
 29 August – Lenny Henry,  British entertainer
 30 August – Muriel Gray, Scottish author, broadcaster and journalist
 13 September – Bobby Davro, actor and comedian
 18 September – Linda Lusardi, British  model, actress, and television presenter
 21 September 
Simon Mayo, British radio presenter
Penny Smith, television presenter
 25 October – Simon Gipps-Kent, actor (died 1987)
 31 October – Debbie McGee, television, radio and stage performer
 6 December – Nick Park, English filmmaker and animator

Deaths
30 November – Gareth Jones, actor

See also
 1958 in British music
 1958 in the United Kingdom
 List of British films of 1958

References